The Vice-Chancellor of Federal University of Agriculture, Abeokuta is the executive head of the University. Upon the VC's appointment by her governing council, the VC has the overall responsibility for the policy and administration of the University. Professor Olusola Kehinde currently serves as acting VC of Federal University of Agriculture, Abeokuta, since 1 November 2022.

Past Vice-Chancellors
 Nurudeen Olorunimbe Adedipe (1988–1995)
 Julius Amioba Okojie (1996–2001)
 Israel Folorunso Adu (2001–2006)
 Ishola Adamson (2006–2007)
 Oluwafemi Olaiya Balogun (2007–2012)
 Olusola Bamidele Oyewole (2012–2017)
 Ololade Ade Enikuomehin (May 2017 – October 2017)
 Felix Kolawole Salako (2017–2022)
 Olusola Kehinde (acting) (2022–present)

References

Academic staff of the Federal University of Agriculture, Abeokuta
Education in Nigeria
Vice-Chancellors of Federal University of Agriculture, Abeokuta